Ravishing (French: Ravissante) is a 1960 French-Italian comedy film directed by Robert Lamoureux and starring Lamoureux, Sylva Koscina and Philippe Noiret.

It was shot at the Epinay Studios in Paris. The film's sets were designed by the art director Rino Mondellini.

Cast
 Robert Lamoureux as Thierry
 Sylva Koscina as Evelyne Cotteret
 Philippe Noiret as Maurice
 Lucile Saint-Simon as Françoise
 Jacques Dacqmine as Marc Cotteret
 Raoul Marco as L'aubergiste
 Dominique Page as Hélène
 Donatella Mauro as L'hôtesse italienne
 Roger Crouzet as Le steward
 Nando Bruno as Official at Rome Airport
 Lucien Frégis as Le garagiste
 Brigitte Juslin as Louise		
 Eddie Constantine as Eddie
 Robert Rollis as 	Homme qui renseigne Thierry

References

Bibliography
 Oscherwitz, Dayna & Higgins, MaryEllen . The A to Z of French Cinema. Scarecrow Press, 2009.

External links

1960 films
Italian comedy films
1960s French-language films
Films directed by Robert Lamoureux
1960 comedy films
French comedy films
Films shot at Epinay Studios
1960s French films
1960s Italian films